Potti, also written as Potty, is a sect of Brahmins in the Kerala state of India.

Potti may also refer to:

People
 Anil Potti, physician
 A. V. Vasudevan Potti, Indian poet
 Sukumaran Potti, Indian writer
 Potti Prasad, Indian actor
 Potti Sreeramulu, Indian revolutionary
 Potti Veeraiah, Indian actor and comedian

Organisms
 Leiocithara potti, a species of sea snail
 Drillia potti, a species of sea snail

See also
 Potty (disambiguation)
 Poti